The Danish ambassador in Washington, D. C. is the official representative of the Government in Copenhagen to the Government of the United States.

History

The Danish Legation was raised to Embassy status on February 6, 1947 during the leadership of Danish Minister Hans Hedtoft and U.S. President Harry S. Truman.

List of representatives

See also
 List of ambassadors of the United States to Denmark
 Denmark–United States relations

References 

 
United States
Denmark